Kergloff is a commune in the Finistère department of Brittany in north-western France.

Population
Inhabitants of Kergloff are called in French Kergloffistes.

Map

See also
Communes of the Finistère department
Listing of the works of the atelier of the Maître de Tronoën

References

External links

Official website 

Mayors of Finistère Association 

Communes of Finistère